Gold Marilyn Monroe is a screenprint painting by Andy Warhol based on a photograph of the actress Marilyn Monroe's face centered on a large ( x ) gold-painted canvas. Warhol used silkscreen ink on synthetic polymer paint on canvas. It was completed in 1962, the same year as Monroe's death. The image of Monroe is a direct copy of a close-up shot from her 1953 film Niagara.

Gold Marilyn Monroe was included in Warhol's first show in New York, at the Stable Gallery in November 1962, where the architect Philip Johnson bought it. He eventually donated it to the Museum of Modern Art (MoMA) in New York City, where it remains.

Marilyn Diptych was another 1962 work by Warhol featuring 50 repeated images using the same photo, half in bright color and half in blurry black and white. In 1967 Warhol used the same photograph again for his Marilyn Monroe portfolio a set of ten brightly and differently colored screenprints.

Artistic technique
Warhol painted a large canvas a shiny gold color. In the center of the canvas and latex, he silk-screened a black and white photograph of Monroe. He painted her face, hair, and blouse.

References

1962 paintings
Paintings by Andy Warhol
Paintings in the collection of the Museum of Modern Art (New York City)
Cultural depictions of Marilyn Monroe